The Nanfang'ao Fishing Port is a fishing harbor in Su'ao Township, Yilan County, Taiwan.

History 

The port was built in 1923. The port has since been expanded several times.

The Nanfang'ao Bridge crossing the harbour entrance fell down on 1 October 2019.

Produce
The port supplies 90% of mackerel demand in Taiwan.

Tourist attractions 
 Nanfang'ao Nantian Temple

References

1923 establishments in Taiwan
Ports and harbors of Yilan County, Taiwan
Transport infrastructure completed in 1923